CEBA may refer to:

Canada Emergency Business Account, a temporary business assistance program in Canada during the COVID-19 pandemic
Continuous Electron Beam Accelerator, a form of particle accelerator
Competitive Equality Banking Act, a 1987 law in the United States